Skim is an open-source PDF reader. It is notably the first free software PDF reader for Mac OS X. It is written in Objective-C, and uses Cocoa APIs. It is released under a BSD license. It is also cited as being able to help annotate and read scientific papers.

History
Its initial release was in April 2007, at version 0.2. Within its first year it managed to gain a small fan base of users due to its ease of use and features which allowed some flexibility over other PDF browsers for Mac OS X.  As of 2008 it had achieved version 1.0. Its main developers were also responsible for another popular open-source program, BibDesk.

Features
Some of its features include the ability to view and bookmark PDFs, highlight and underline selectable PDF text, and a full-screen and presentation mode, along with a split mode that allows scrolling a PDF separately in two parts on the same screen. It also allows the adding of circles and boxes, as well as being able to embed and edit notes.

See also
List of PDF software

References

External links

MacOS-only free software
Free software programmed in Objective-C
Free PDF readers
Software using the BSD license